Michael Fetchick (October 13, 1922 – March 8, 2012) was an American professional golfer who played on the PGA Tour and the Senior PGA Tour.

Fetchick was born in Yonkers, New York. He turned pro in 1950 and joined the PGA Tour in 1952. He won the 1956 Western Open at The Presidio in San Francisco, California in an 18-hole playoff over Doug Ford, Jay Hebert and Don January. In the 1950s, the Western Open was considered by some to be one of major championships in men's professional golf along with The Masters, U.S. Open and the PGA Championship. It's generally conceded by golf historians that Fetchick's victory over the sports top stars resulted in a demotion for the Western Open below the other majors. His best finish in an event considered to be one of four modern major championships was T13 at the 1957 U.S. Open.

Prior to Scott Hoch winning in 2019 at the age of 63 years and 5 months, Fetchick held the Champions Tour record for the oldest winner (1985 Hilton Head Seniors International on his 63rd birthday), and the longest time between his last PGA Tour victory and his first Champions Tour victory: 28 years, 9 months and 27 days. Fetchick also finished T-2 (playoff loss) at the 1990 NYNEX Commemorative at age 67.

Fetchick died in 2012.

Professional wins (10)

PGA Tour wins (3)

Other wins (4)
1955 Imperial Valley Open
1963 Long Island PGA Championship
1964 Long Island PGA Championship
1982 Long Island PGA Championship

Senior PGA Tour wins (1)

Senior PGA Tour playoff record (0–1)

Other senior wins (2)
1990 Liberty Mutual Legends of Golf - Legendary Division (with Bob Toski)
1992 Liberty Mutual Legends of Golf - Legendary Division (with Bob Toski)

References

External links

American male golfers
PGA Tour golfers
PGA Tour Champions golfers
Golfers from New York (state)
Sportspeople from Yonkers, New York
1922 births
2012 deaths